Cleve Barry Moler is an American mathematician and computer programmer specializing in numerical analysis. In the mid to late 1970s, he was one of the authors of LINPACK and EISPACK, Fortran libraries for numerical computing.  He invented MATLAB, a numerical computing package, to give his students at the University of New Mexico easy access to these libraries without writing Fortran.  In 1984, he co-founded MathWorks with Jack Little to commercialize this program.

Biography
He received his bachelor's degree from California Institute of Technology in 1961, and a Ph.D. in 1965 from Stanford University, both in mathematics.  He worked for Charles Lawson at the Jet Propulsion Laboratory in 1961 and 1962.

He was a professor of mathematics and computer science for almost 20 years at the University of Michigan, Stanford University, and the University of New Mexico.  Before joining MathWorks full-time in 1989, he also worked for Intel Hypercube, where he coined the term "embarrassingly parallel", and Ardent Computer Corporation.  He is also co-author of four textbooks on numerical methods and is a member of the Association for Computing Machinery.  He was president of the Society for Industrial and Applied Mathematics 2007–2008.

He was elected a member of the National Academy of Engineering on February 14, 1997, for conceiving and developing widely used mathematical software. He received an honorary degree from Linköping University, Sweden. He received an honorary degree of Doctor of Mathematics from the University of Waterloo on June 16, 2001. On April 30, 2004, he was appointed Honorary Doctor (doctor technices, honoris causa) at the Technical University of Denmark. In 2009, he was recognized by Society for Industrial and Applied Mathematics as a SIAM Fellow  for his outstanding contributions to numerical analysis and software, including the invention of MATLAB. In April 2012, the IEEE Computer Society named Cleve the recipient of the 2012 Computer Pioneer Award. In February 2014, IEEE named Cleve the recipient of the 2014 IEEE John von Neumann Medal. In April 2017, he was made Fellow of the Computer History Museum.

Publications
Forsythe, George E., Malcolm, Michael A., Moler, Cleve B., "Computer methods for mathematical computations", Prentice-Hall Series in Automatic Computation, Prentice-Hall., Englewood Cliffs, N.J., 1977.    
Moler, Cleve B., "Numerical Computing with MATLAB", Society for Industrial and Applied Mathematics, 2004,

References

External links
 MathWorks biography of Moler
 Cleve Moler, Oral history interview by Thomas Haigh, 8 and 9 March, 2004, Santa Barbara, California. Society for Industrial and Applied Mathematics, Philadelphia, PA Lengthy interview transcript covering Moler's entire career. Full text available online.
 
 
 

1939 births
20th-century American mathematicians
21st-century American mathematicians
Computer programmers
University of Michigan faculty
Stanford University Department of Mathematics faculty
University of New Mexico faculty
California Institute of Technology alumni
Stanford University School of Humanities and Sciences alumni
Living people
Numerical analysts
Fellows of the Society for Industrial and Applied Mathematics
Members of the United States National Academy of Engineering
Presidents of the Society for Industrial and Applied Mathematics